Running Time may refer to:

 Running Time (film)
 Time complexity